The 40th General Assembly of Nova Scotia represented Nova Scotia between August 22, 1933, to June 20, 1937.

Division of seats
There were 30 members of the General Assembly, elected in the 1933 Nova Scotia general election.

List of members

Former members of the 40th General Assembly

References

Terms of the General Assembly of Nova Scotia
1933 establishments in Nova Scotia
1937 disestablishments in Nova Scotia
20th century in Nova Scotia